Pythia cecillii is a species of small air-breathing salt marsh snail, a pulmonate gastropod mollusk in the family Ellobiidae. 

The specific name cecillii is in honor of the French admiral Jean-Baptiste Cécille.

Distribution 
This species occurs in Japan.

It is critically endangered and endangered (CR＋EN) in Japan.

References

External links
 Philippi, R. A. (1847-1848). Testaceorum novorum centuria. Zeitschrift für Malakozoologie. 4(5): 71-77; 4(6): 84-96; 4(8): 113-127

Ellobiidae
Gastropods described in 1847